is a Japanese comedian and actor and former politician.

Comedy career
Nishikawa trained to be a comedian under Kin Ishii, and became a student at Yoshimoto Shinkigeki (a comedy troupe run by Yoshimoto Kogyo) in 1964. In 1966, he formed a manzai duo with Yasushi Yokoyama, and rose to fame, the pair eventually becoming one of the leaders of the manzai boom of the early 1980s. The pair won the Kamigata Manzai Grand Prize three times in 1970, 1977, and 1980.

Political career

Nishikawa served in Japan's House of Councillors for three terms between 1986 and 2004 as an independent, representing the Osaka district. He came first all three times he stood for office, with more than one million votes. Nishikawa resumed his entertainment career after 2004.

Personal life
Nishikawa's wife is Helen Nishikawa. They married in 1967 when she was a top actress in Yoshimoto Shinkigeki and he still an up-and-coming comedian.

Filmography

Film
The 47 Ronin in Debt (2019)

Television
Massan (NHK, 2014–15)
Warotenka (NHK, 2017–18)

Honours
Person of Cultural Merit (2020)

References

1946 births
Japanese comedians
Living people
Members of the House of Councillors (Japan)
Japanese male actors
People from Kōchi, Kōchi
Japanese actor-politicians
Persons of Cultural Merit